Simonelli is an Italian surname. Notable people with the surname include:

Alberto Simonelli (born 1967), Italian Paralympic archer
Damon Simonelli (1959–2004), American planetary scientist
Giorgio Simonelli (1901–1966), Italian film director, editor, screenwriter and journalist
Giovanni Simonelli (born 1952), Italian football manager
Giuseppe Simonelli (c. 1650–1710), Italian Baroque painter
Pasquale Simonelli (1878–1960), Italian-American banker
Virginio Simonelli (born 1985), Italian singer
Vittorio Simonelli (1860–1929), Italian geologist and paleontologist

See also
8071 Simonelli, a main-belt asteroid

Italian-language surnames
Patronymic surnames
Surnames from given names